Cabo San Pío (English: Cape San Pio) at , the southernmost tip of mainland Isla Grande de Tierra del Fuego as well as of Argentina, except for the small islet Islote Blanco that lies about  off the coast in SW direction (about  further to the south).

The brick tower with orange and red bands (or red and white stripes), and an exterior ladder, is shaped like a bowling pin.

The Beagle Conflict was a border dispute between Argentina and Chile, in which Argentina claimed sovereignty of the  Picton, Lennox and Nueva islands off the coast south of Tierra del Fuego, and took both countries to the brink of war in 1978. The conflicts date back to the Boundary Treaty of July 23, 1881, which did not specify the border in detail in these waters. The conflict was finally resolved on January 23, 1984, when Argentina and Chile signed the Treaty of Peace and Friendship of 1984 between Chile and Argentina giving the islands to Chile but most maritime rights to Argentina.

See also
 The Moat channel

References

Isla Grande de Tierra del Fuego
Headlands of Argentina